This is a list of mutual funds and ETFs in the United States ordered by assets under management as of 28 March 2019. The numbers listed below are from the Lipper Performance Report.

References